This is a list of FM radio stations in the United States having call signs beginning with the letters KD through KF. Low-power FM radio stations, those with designations such as KDDE-LP, have not been included in this list.

KD--

KE--

KF--

See also
 North American call sign

FM radio stations in the United States by call sign (initial letters KD-KF)